Lotta Giesenfeld (born March 11, 1962) is a Swedish female curler.

Teams

References

External links
 

Living people
1962 births
Swedish female curlers
Swedish curling champions